Fyodorovskoye is a rural locality (a selo) in Nebylovskoye Rural Settlement, Yuryev-Polsky District, Vladimir Oblast, Russia. The population was 631 as of 2010.

Geography 
It is located on the Toma River, 9 km north-west from Nebyloye, 18 km south-east from Yuryev-Polsky.

References 

Rural localities in Yuryev-Polsky District